The 1940 North Carolina Tar Heels football team represented the University of North Carolina at Chapel Hill during the 1940 college football season. The Tar Heels were led by fifth-year head coach Raymond Wolf and played their home games at Kenan Memorial Stadium. They competed as a member of the Southern Conference.

Paul Severin was selected as a first-team All-American end by the Associated Press for a second straight year, as well as by the NEA, Newsweek, and Football Digest. He is remembered for a game-saving tackle of Steve Lach in UNC's win against rival Duke.

Schedule

References

North Carolina
North Carolina Tar Heels football seasons
North Carolina Tar Heels football